Malcolm Henry Ellis, CMG (21 August 1890 – 18 January 1969) was an Australian journalist, historian, critic, reviewer and staunch anti-communist. His younger brother Ulrich Ellis was also a journalist and historian.

Ellis won praise during World War II for his column, "The Service Man", which appeared under the pseudonym "Ek Dum". Using radio reports and his knowledge of terrain, he described military campaigns in a realistic manner so that it was assumed he was present. His series of anti-communist tracts, the most famous of which was The Red Road (1932), was lurid and divisive.

Due to his staunch criticism of the writing of Manning Clark, who in Ellis's view was a Communist fellow traveller, he almost subverted the launching of the Australian Dictionary of Biography. "History without facts", his excoriating and now legendary review in the Sydney Bulletin of the first volume of Clark's A History of Australia, is for many the main legacy of his otherwise extensive works, which include biographies of key early Australian colonial figures, Francis Greenway, John Macarthur and Lachlan Macquarie.

Awards
 1942: awarded the S. H. Prior prize by The Bulletin for his John Murtagh Macrossan lectures at the University of Queensland on Macquarie
 1956: appointed Companion of the Order of St Michael and St George (C.M.G.) 
 21 October 1966: honorary doctorate conferred by the University of Newcastle. The vice-chancellor, Professor James Auchmuty, praised him for contributing more than any other historian to 'knowledge of our country in the first half century of its existence'

Notes

Sources & external links

1890 births
1969 deaths
Australian biographers
Male biographers
Australian anti-communists
Writers from New South Wales
Australian Companions of the Order of St Michael and St George
20th-century Australian historians
20th-century Australian journalists